The 1944 Cleveland Rams season was the team's seventh year with the National Football League. 

The Rams went into recess for 1943 due to the exodus of players and other team personnel to serve in World War II.

Schedule

Standings

Cleveland Rams
Cleveland Rams seasons
Cleveland Rams